Vadaseri South is a major village in the Orathanadu taluk of Thanjavur district in the Indian state of Tamil Nadu. Vadaseri comes under the Orathanadu constituency which elects a member to the Tamil Nadu Legislative Assembly once every five years and it is a part of the Thanjavur (Lok Sabha constituency) which elects its Member of Parliament (MP) once in five years. As of 2011, the village had a population of 4,810. The village is a part of the fertile Cauvery delta region and agriculture is the major occupation.

Demographics 

Vadaseri is a small agricultural village in Thanjavur District, the food grain and temple district of Tamil Nadu, India. Vadaseri is located about 35 km, South-East of Thanjavur. It has a population of about 10,000, majority of them are engaged in agricultural activities. Most of the population belongs to the Agamudaiyar-Thevar Community who maintain strong cultural and social bindings.

In recent times, most of the natives of Vadaseri have migrated to various parts of India and abroad to improve their educational and economical status. They are in business as well as in employment with Government and private sectors.

This website is developed primarily to help the relatives maintain the same cultural and social bindings while being located outside of their native. This helps the Vadaseri community people across the world to stay online and have access to the updated information about their people.

Location 

Vadaseri 10° 34′ 7″ N, 79° 22′ 47″ E is located along the southeastern coast of India in the East-central region of Tamil Nadu, in the general Kaveri River delta area. Vadaseri is about 42 km from the history city Thanjavur, 14 km east of Orathanadu, 16 km north of Pattukkottai and 15 km south of Mannargudi. It lies on SH146 Mannargudi - Pattukkottai - Sethubhavachatram Road. Vadaseri is the last village lies in the boarder of Thanjavur district. The coast of the Bay of Bengal is just 30  km away.

Area 

About 3 km radius.

Population 

Vadaseri has a population of about 10000.  People with different religious ideologies live in harmony. About 70% of the old generations are literate and younger generations are 100% educated. Its quite encouraging to note that in the past 15/20 years lot of engineers, doctors, advocates, arts and science graduates, PhDs are emerging from Vadaseri relatives.

Administration 

Vadaseri comes under Orathanadu Taluk and Thanjavur district. It is now a major Panchayat category with maximum revenue generating village under Orathanadu Taluk. It is governed locally by the elected Panchayat President and board members. Also there are two government-appointed Village Administrative Officers (VAO).

Schools 

There are two government elementary schools and one higher secondary school serving the Vadaseri and surrounding villages.

Library 

There are two libraries at Vadaseri. One Government District Branch Library functioning near Panchayat Office in its own building. There is another small library called Thiru.Vi.Ka Library situated at the junction of North Street and Thanjavur road.

Hospitals 

There is a Govt. Dispensary in Primary Health Center grade. Apart from this, many doctors - MBBS, RIMP, LIMP qualified and experienced are running clinics.

Veterinary Hospital 

There is one veterinary hospital

Cooperative Society 

There is a co-op society and bank at Vadaseri serving Vadaseri and neighboring villages.

Banks 

Indian Bank is having a branch at vadaseri, since 1970.

Post Office 

There is a post and telegraph office with a sub-post master.

Telephone Facility 

There is an Electronic Telephone Sub-Exchange directly under the control of Orathanadu Main Telephone Exchange, serving Vadaseri and neighboring villages. There are many private public STD/ISD/PCOs functioning at Vadaseri.

Mobile Telephone Facility 

Government-owned BSNL, private operators have put up their towers at Vadaseri and established connectivity with rest of the world.

EB Substation 

Due to heavy demand with about 500 bore wells in and around Vadaseri, recently the EB Department has installed one sub station at Vadaseri. Because of this, the voltage problems are eliminated at Vadaseri.

Temples 

There are many temples within Vadaseri. The primary temple is the recently re-constructed Sri Kamatchi Amman with Sri Sivan temple complex.

Recreation 

There is one touring (semi permanent) cinema theatre functioning for the past 3 years.

Book on Vadaseri History 

Theetha. C. Natesan alias Choolai Natesan and Kurunatha. Pey. Ramyan alias Kuberaa have published books on Vadaseri History individually.

References 

 

Villages in Thanjavur district